Jameson Hunt (born April 20, 1984) is a Canadian former professional ice hockey defenceman who played one game for the Washington Capitals of the National Hockey League (NHL).

Playing career
Undrafted, Jamie signed as a free agent with the Washington Capitals from Mercyhurst College. He played a solitary game in the NHL in the 2006–07 season with the Capitals.

On August 18, 2009, Hunt returned to North America from a season in Germany with Augsburger Panther to sign a one-year contract with the Chicago Wolves of the American Hockey League. After scoring 17 points in 42 games, despite enduring injury, Hunt re-signed to a one-year contract with the Wolves on August 3, 2010.

After playing 27 games in the 2010–11 season with the Wolves, Hunt was released from his contract and signed with Austrian team, Graz 99ers, for the remainder of the year on January 31, 2011.

Jamie was also a lacrosse player, playing for the Okotoks Raiders in the Alberta Jr. A Lacrosse League.

Career statistics

Awards and honours

See also
List of players who played only one game in the NHL

References

External links
 

1984 births
Living people
Augsburger Panther players
Calgary Canucks players
Canadian ice hockey defencemen
Canadian people of British descent
Chicago Wolves players
Graz 99ers players
Hershey Bears players
Mercyhurst Lakers men's ice hockey players
Ice hockey people from Calgary
Undrafted National Hockey League players
Washington Capitals players
Canadian expatriate ice hockey players in Austria
Canadian expatriate ice hockey players in Germany